is a hybrid racing/role-playing arcade video game developed and originally published by SNK on July 24, 1990. It was the first title for both the Neo Geo MVS (arcade) and Neo Geo AES (home) platforms that featured "Multi Play" (Multi-Link) support, which allowed two systems to be connected via a phone jack port integrated into each cartridge for versus LAN play.

In the game, players have the choice to participate on a worldwide grand prix tour against AI-controlled opponents, assume the role of a protagonist who embark on a quest to enter the Suzuka 8 Hours endurance race or compete in matches against other human players. Riding Hero was first launched for the Neo Geo MVS before being later released for both Neo Geo AES and Neo Geo CD in 1991 and 1995 respectively, in addition to being re-released through download services for various consoles, among other ways to play it as of date.

Since its initial launch, Riding Hero has been met with a mixed reception from both critics and reviewers alike who felt divided in regards to various aspects such as the visuals, sound design, controls and gameplay, though some regarded the single-player role-playing game mode as a novel concept and the multiplayer offering was noted to be one of the game's positive points. Its multiplayer LAN support would later be re-used in other titles for Neo Geo.

Gameplay 

Riding Hero is a racing game that uses a behind-the-motorcycle perspective similar to Super Hang-On and Suzuka 8 Hours featuring a Grand Prix mode, a role-playing single-player campaign mode reminiscent of Final Lap Twin, as well as a multiplayer mode like most other racing titles released in the era. In the grand prix mode, players compete against AI-controlled racers on a worldwide Grand Prix tour in order to become the champion, while up to two human players can compete on versus matches in the multiplayer mode by connecting two Neo Geo systems via LAN. Every race in the game is timed and if the players fails regain time by completing a lap, the game is over unless the player inserts more credits into the arcade machine to continue playing. If a memory card is present, players are allowed to save their progress during the single-player campaign at the protagonist's home and resume the last point the game was saved at.

In the role-playing single-player mode, players assume the role of an aspiring motorcycle racer on a quest to enter the Suzuka 8 Hours endurance race. Players travel over the map, meeting locals and facing small-time racers in order to earn money that can be spent on purchasing new bikes and upgrade their current bike, until enough money is collected to enter the endurance race and face the champion Diamond Dave. Both the grand prix and role-playing modes give a set number of turbo boosts to the players before each race that can be used to gain higher speeds and outrun opponents.

Development and release 

Riding Hero was initially first launched for arcades on July 24, 1990, becoming the first title in the Neo Geo library that featured "Multi Play" (Multi-Link) support that allowed two systems to be connected via a phone jack port integrated into each cartridge for LAN play. The game was then released for Neo Geo AES on July 1, 1991 and retained the LAN support for versus play. The title was later re-released for the Neo Geo CD on May 26, 1995, with minimal changes compared to the original MVS and AES versions minus the multiplayer mode. It has received a re-release in recent years on various digital distribution platforms such as the PlayStation Network, Nintendo eShop and Xbox Live by HAMSTER Corporation.

Reception 

In North America, it was the top-grossing new video game on the RePlay arcade charts in November 1990. RePlay later reported Riding Hero to be the fifteenth most-popular arcade game in January 1991.

The game had some notable issues, the most common being how easy it was for the AI to put the player in a spin often times unrecoverable. The vehicle movement was too predictable and bike itself ran choppy and the braking was very weak.

Riding Hero was received with a mostly mixed reception from critics and reviewers since its original release.

Legacy 
Although Riding Hero never received a sequel or a spiritual successor of sorts, its LAN play feature would be re-used in SNK's own League Bowling and Alpha Denshi's Thrash Rally, the first of which allowed up to four or eight people for multiplayer.

Notes

References

External links 
 Riding Hero at GameFAQs
 Riding Hero at Giant Bomb
 Riding Hero at Killer List of Videogames
 Riding Hero at MobyGames

1990 video games
ACA Neo Geo games
Arcade video games
Motorcycle video games
Multiplayer and single-player video games
Neo Geo games
Neo Geo CD games
Nintendo Switch games
PlayStation Network games
PlayStation 4 games
Racing video games
Role-playing video games
SNK games
Video games set in Australia
Video games set in Brazil
Video games set in France
Video games set in Germany
Video games set in Italy
Video games set in Japan
Video games set in Spain
Video games set in Sweden
Video games set in the United States
Video games set in the United Kingdom
Windows games
Xbox One games
Video games developed in Japan
Hamster Corporation games